Barbara Jane Howlett is an Australian fungal plant pathologist.

Biography
Howlett grew up on a farm, which is a main reason for her interest in agriculture. Howlett received her BSc with honors from the University of Melbourne in 1970, her MSc from the Australian National University in 1973, and her PhD from the University of Melbourne in 1981. She is currently a professor at the University of Melbourne.

In 2011 Howlett led an Australian team of researchers who, along with scientists from the French National Institute for Agricultural Research, sequenced the genome of the blackleg fungus (Leptosphaeria maculans), which attacks canola crops and, in 2003, caused 90% yield losses in parts of Australia. Howlett was able to identify the pathogenicity gene which encodes for isocitrate lyase, an enzyme that is necessary for the fungus to colonize canola. The research saved canola farmers on Eyre Peninsula, South Australia, at least $18 million in 2012.

She was elected a Fellow of the American Academy of Microbiology in 2012, and Fellow of the Australian Academy of Science in 2014, which described her as a "leading international fungal plant pathologist". Howlett is currently a member of the National Science and Technology Council of Australia, which provides advice to the federal government, specifically the Prime Minister, on important scientific and technological matters.

Publications

Howlett has published numerous scholarly works and edited two books:
 Evolution of Virulence in Eukaryotic Microbes (2012)
 Sustainable strategies for managing Brassica napus (oilseed rape) resistance to Leptosphaeria maculans (phoma stem canker) (2006)

References

Living people
Year of birth missing (living people)
Women phytopathologists
University of Melbourne alumni
Australian National University alumni
Academic staff of the University of Melbourne
Australian women academics
Australian microbiologists
Women microbiologists
Fellows of the Australian Academy of Science